George Edward "Ed" Logg (born 1948 in Seattle) is a retired American arcade video game designer, first employed at Atari, Inc. and later at Atari Games. He currently resides in Los Altos, California.

Career

Logg was impressed with the Atari 2600 (then known as "Atari Video Computer System") and joined Atari's coin-op division and worked on Dirt Bike, which was never released due to an unsuccessful field test. He co-developed with Ed Rotberg Super Breakout after hearing that Nolan Bushnell, co-founder of Atari, wanted Breakout updated. He co-developed the video game Asteroids with Lyle Rains. Other games designed or co-designed by Logg include Centipede, Millipede, the Gauntlet series (with inspiration from John Palevich's Dandy), Wayne Gretzky's 3D Hockey and the home versions of the San Francisco Rush series.

Legacy
In 2011, Logg was awarded a Pioneer Award by the Academy of Interactive Arts and Sciences for being among those who "laid the foundations of the multi-billion dollar videogame industry." Logg was listed at number 43 in IGN top 100 game creators of all time.

Games
 Asteroids (1979)
 Othello (1980)
 Super Breakout (1981)
 Centipede (1981)
 Millipede (1982)
 Gauntlet (1985)
  Gauntlet II (1986)
 Xybots (1987)
 Tetris (Atari) (1988)
 Steel Talons (1991)
 Space Lords (1992)
 Gauntlet IV (1993)
 Wayne Gretzky's 3D Hockey (1996)
 San Francisco Rush: Extreme Racing (1997)
 Rush 2: Extreme Racing USA (1998)
 San Francisco Rush 2049 (2000)
 Dr. Muto (2002)

References

External links
 Ed Logg at Arcade History 
 
 

1948 births
American video game designers
Atari people
Ed Logg games
Living people
People from Los Altos, California
People from Seattle
Academy of Interactive Arts & Sciences Pioneer Award recipients